A village (kyei-ywa; or , ywa) is the smallest subdivision of Myanmar's rural village tracts. As of August 2015, there are 70,838 villages in Myanmar.

See also 
 Administrative divisions of Myanmar

References

Burma 5
Subdivisions of Myanmar